This article lists fellows of the Royal Society elected in 1921.

Fellows 

Wilfred Eade Agar
Francis William Aston
Sir William Lawrence Bragg
William Thomas Calman
Arthur Harry Church
Georges Dreyer
William Henry Eccles
Sir John Charles Grant Ledingham
Charles Stewart Middlemiss
Kennedy Joseph Previté Orton
Sir John Herbert Parsons
James Charles Philip
Alfred Arthur Robb
Sir Eustace Tennyson d'Eyncourt, 1st Baronet
Udny Yule

Foreign members

Leon Charles Albert Calmette
Henri Alexandre Deslandres
Albert Einstein
Albin Haller
Edmund Beecher Wilson
Pieter Zeeman

References

1921
1921 in the United Kingdom
1921 in science